The term ghetto riots, also termed ghetto rebellions, race riots, or negro riots refers to summer social unrest across the United States in the 1960s, characterized by African American groups using violent tactics.

The six days of unrest throughout New York City during the Harlem riot of 1964 is viewed as the first of clusters of riots, uncoordinated with each other, evidently unplanned, most often in cities during the summer months.  The pattern caused 159 separate incidents of violence and unrest over the long, hot summer of 1967, came to a climax during the national wave of King assassination riots in over 100 American cities in 1968, and relented in 1969.

History

Background
Before the ghetto riots of the 1960s African American violent resistance to challenge white dominance was much more limited, including only small slave rebellions and armed defenses in the early 1900s. Most of these actions were defensive in nature rather than retaliatory, it was not until the Harlem riots of 1935 and 1943 that African Americans seemed to take initiative in violent conflicts. By the 1950s and 1960s significant societal changes had taken place which fostered conditions for much more open rebellion. Recent urban decay caused by white flight and middle-class Black flight from city centers also antagonized lower-class minority populations who had struggled to migrate to cities.

Riots
The Harlem riot of 1964 is seen as the beginning of a wave of riots that would engulf New York City and begin to be seen in cities throughout the country until calming in 1968 with the last being the King assassination riots. These urban riots were unplanned and mostly attacked property of white owned businesses rather than people, before this most American riots involved brutal attacks against minorities. The riots resulted in over 150 deaths and over 20,000 arrests.

Incidents include:

 Harlem riot of 1964
 1964 Rochester race riot
 Dixmoor race riot, August, 1964
 1964 Philadelphia race riot
 Watts riots, August, 1965
 1966 Chicago West Side riots
 Hough riots, July, 1966
 Waukegan riot of 1966
 1966 Dayton race riot
 Hunters Point social uprising (1966)
 Benton Harbor riots of 1966
 Long, hot summer of 1967
 1967 Atlanta riots
 Boston riots
 1967 Buffalo riot
 1967 Cairo, Illinois riot
 Cambridge riot of 1967
 Cincinnati riot of 1967
 1967 Detroit riot
 1967 Milwaukee riot
 1967 Newark riots
 1967 New York City riot
 1967 Plainfield riots
 1967 Saginaw riot
 Albina Riot of 1967
 King assassination riots, April 1968
 1968 Washington, D.C., riots
 1968 Chicago riots
 Baltimore riot of 1968
 1968 Kansas City, Missouri riot
 1968 Detroit riot
 1968 New York City riot
 1968 Pittsburgh riots
 Cincinnati riot of 1968
 Trenton New Jersey riots of 1968
 Wilmington riot of 1968
 1968 Louisville riots

The 1968 Miami riot grew out of an organized protest, in contrast to most of these previous incidents, so may not fall in the same category.  Likewise, the Division Street riots in Chicago of June 1966 shares all the relevant characteristics of these others, expressing similar ethnic tensions and grievances, except the rioters were Puerto Rican, not African-American.

Perhaps the last of the pattern was the July 1969 York race riot in Pennsylvania, where racial tensions broke out over several days, resulting in the fatal shooting of a rookie police officer and the murder of a visiting black woman from South Carolina by a white gang; after renewed interest in both cases 30 years later, York's mayor, Charlie Robertson, was arrested and arraigned for his role in the white gang while campaigning for his third term, then ultimately found not guilty.

In August 1969, federal officials considered the period of large-scale riots to be over. However, after the murder of George Floyd by a white police officer in Minneapolis in 2020, and other incidents (see List of incidents and protests of the 2020–2022 United States racial unrest), as well as earlier events, e.g., the 1992 Los Angeles riots, and subsequent nationwide violent street protests, this view would no longer be accurate.

Kerner Commission

President Johnson appointed a commission on July 28, 1967, while rioting was still occurring in Detroit, to investigate the causes of the urban unrest.  The commission's scope included the 164 disorders occurring in the first nine months of 1967.  The President had directed them, in simple words, to document what happened, find out why it happened, and find out how to prevent it.  While acknowledging the incidents as "unusual, irregular, complex and unpredictable social processes," the commission was able to identify broad patterns and draw conclusions, the first of which was:

The civil disorders of 1967 involved Negroes acting against local symbols of white American society, authority and property in Negro neighborhoods -- rather than against white persons.

The report identified police practices, unemployment and underemployment, and lack of adequate housing as the most significant grievances motivating the rage.

Reactions

Conservative elements of American society regarded the riots as evidence for the need of law and order. Richard Nixon made social order a prime issue in his campaign for president.

The mayor of Jersey City (Thomas J. Whelan) instead saw the riots as an indicator that more social programs were needed for the city and in 1964 asked for federal funds to provide "new recreational, housing, educational and sanitary facilities for low‐income groups".

Federal grants for "urban renewal and antipoverty efforts", as in New Haven, were also discussed in relation to the riots.
In August 1968, over $4 million were offered by the Justice Department to the states in what was described as "the first Federal money designated to prepare for and help avert rioting in the cities". In April 1969, John Lindsay asked to increase federal funds but as of November 1969 the $200 million promised to restore 20 cities had not yet come to fruition.

Research

Cause of riots
Many rioters can be seen as disillusioned African Americans whose families may have moved to cities to find better living conditions but after generations remained stuck in urban ghettos with little economic mobility. Local troubles with access to decent housing and work along with other factors like police harassment made urban areas ripe for violence.

Immediate causes were often aggressive confrontations between African Americans and whites or police officers that drew a crowd and began to spiral into violence and chaos.

In July 1963, demonstrations in Brooklyn for better working conditions in the construction industry had reportedly risked escalating to riots.

Dynamics of riots
Rioters often acted collectively, destroying property they viewed as being owned by those exploiting them. Police officers often were seen as the greatest antagonists to rioters because their actions and racist language became symbols of the oppressive conditions faced by African Americans.

See also
 Civil rights movement
 Nadir of American race relations
 List of incidents of civil unrest in the United States

References

 
1960s riots
1960s in the United States
African-American riots in the United States
Riots and civil disorder in the United States
Post–civil rights era in African-American history
History of civil rights in the United States